Gao is a department or commune of Ziro Province in Burkina Faso.

Cities 
The department consists of a chief town :

 Gao

and 8 villages:

 Dao
 lerou
 Mao Nessira
 Pani

 Passin
 Tékrou
 Yinga
 Zoro.

References 

Departments of Burkina Faso
Ziro Province